Manikchari is an upazila of Khagrachari District in the Division of Chittagong, Bangladesh.

Geography
It has 8,218 households and total area 168.35 km2.

Demographics
As of the 1991 Bangladesh census, Manikchari has a population of 38,479. Males constitute 52% of the population, and females 48%. The adult(18+) population is 19,539. Manikchari has an average literacy rate of 20.4% (7+ years), and the national average of 32.4% literate.

Administration
Manikchhari Upazila is divided into four union parishads: Batnatali, Jogyachola, Manikchari, and Tintahari. The union parishads are subdivided into 12 mauzas and 160 villages.

See also
Upazilas of Bangladesh
Districts of Bangladesh
Divisions of Bangladesh

References

Upazilas of Khagrachhari District